Ademir Bernardes Alcântara (born 17 December 1962) is a Brazilian retired footballer who played as attacking midfielder.

Career
Born in Mandaguaçu, Paraná, Alcântara started in Brazil lower leagues. After being top-scorer of the 1984 Campeonato Gaúcho, he joined Internacional, staying two seasons before moving to Portugal, joining Vitória Guimarães.

In Guimarães, in his first year, he partnered with Paulinho Cascavel to help  Minho side overachieved for a final third place, and qualified for the UEFA Cup. His second year was even better, scoring 15 league goals as Guimarães nearly avoid relegation. Subsequently, he caught the eye of Portuguese powerhouses S.L. Benfica and F.C. Porto. In what some consider, the beginning of the hatred rivalry between the two. Alcântara chose Benfica and Porto exacted revenge by signing Dito and Rui Àguas.
He won the title in the first year first year, but lost his place to Valdo, after he was deemed too slow.

After two seasons, he moved elsewhere, first in Boavista and then in Marítimo, where he was influential in helping the team qualify for the 1993–94 UEFA Cup.

References

External links

 

1962 births
Living people
Brazilian footballers
Sportspeople from Paraná (state)
Esporte Clube Pelotas players
Sport Club Internacional players
Vitória S.C. players
S.L. Benfica footballers
Boavista F.C. players
C.S. Marítimo players
Primeira Liga players
Mogi Mirim Esporte Clube players
Coritiba Foot Ball Club players
Brazilian expatriate footballers
Brazilian expatriate sportspeople in Portugal
Expatriate footballers in Portugal
Association football midfielders